Zachary Stephen Williams is an American Christian rock artist from Jonesboro, Arkansas. From 2007 through 2012 he was a member and lead vocalist of Zach Williams & The Reformation (also acoustic guitar and harmonica). He was also the lead singer of the Christian group Brothers of Grace, renamed as Zach Williams and the Brothers of Grace. In 2016 he went solo.

Beginnings

Zachary Stephen Williams was born in Pensacola, Florida on June 27, 1978 but grew up in Jonesboro, Arkansas.

Music career

Zach Williams & The Reformation
He was the lead singer in Zach Williams & The Reformation, an American rock band formed in Jonesboro, Arkansas in 2007 by the group of Zach Williams (acoustic guitar, harmonica and vocals), Red Dorton (bass guitar and vocals), Robby Rigsbee (slide guitar and rhythm guitar), Josh Copeland (lead guitar, rhythm guitar and vocals) and Evan Wilons (drums). The band took their name from the desire to reform or revitalize the southern rock sound. The band released two independent albums, Electric Revival in 2009 and A Southern Offering in 2011. In 2012, Williams disbanded the Reformation due to his newfound Christian beliefs.

The Brothers of Grace / Zach Williams and the Brothers of Grace
After Zach Williams and the Reformation disbanded, Williams and guitarist Robby Rigsbee dedicated their lives to Christ and began playing music in their church. Church band the Brothers of Grace became Zach Williams and the Brothers of Grace. Shaun Kirby, who had previously been part of southern rock band Further Down with Rigsbee, was the drummer. The group also included Bruce Ford (bass) and Kevin Rouse (keyboard). They independently released an EP, "Shine a Light," in 2014.

Solo career
In 2016 Williams signed to Provident Label Group - Essential Records as a solo artist, four years after Zach Williams & The Reformation disbanded. He released his first solo single, "Chain Breaker" in 2016 which reached No. 1 on the Hot Christian Songs Chart and the Top 10 on Christian radio. Following the single, Williams released a five-song EP, Chain Breaker, with producers Jonathan Smith and Colby Wedgeworth.

On December 14, 2016, Williams digitally released his full-length album, Chain Breaker, and announced a release date of January 27, 2017 for the CD.

On October 4, 2019, Williams released his second album, Rescue Story. It includes the single, "There Was Jesus", with Dolly Parton.

Discography

Albums
As Zach Williams & The Reformation
2009: Electric Revival (Independent)
2011: A Southern Offering (Independent)

Solo

EPs
As Zach Williams and the Brothers of Grace
2014: Shine a Light EP

Solo

Holiday albums

Singles

As lead artist

Promotional singles

As featured artist

Other charted songs

Awards and nominations

American Music Awards 

|-
| 2018
| Zach Williams
| Favorite Artist – Contemporary Inspirational
| 
|-
| 2021
| Zach Williams
| Favorite Artist – Contemporary Inspirational
| 
|}

Billboard Music Awards

|-
| rowspan="2" | 2018
| Zach Williams
| Top Christian Artist
| 
|-
| "Old Church Choir"
| Top Christian Song
| 
|-
| 2019
| Zach Williams
| Top Christian Artist
| 
|-
| rowspan="3" | 2021
| Zach Williams
| Top Christian Artist
| 
|-
| Rescue Story
| Top Christian Album
| 
|-
| "There Was Jesus" 
| Top Christian Song
| 
|-
|}

Grammy Awards

GMA Dove Awards

|-
| rowspan="5" | 2017
| rowspan="2" | Zach Williams
| New Artist of the Year 
| 
|-
| Contemporary Christian Artist of the Year
| 
|-
| rowspan="2" | "Chain Breaker"
| Song of the Year 
| 
|-
| Pop/Contemporary Recorded Song of the Year
| *
|-
| Chain Breaker
| Pop/Contemporary Album of the Year
| 
|-
| rowspan="2"| 2019
| Zach Williams
| Contemporary Christian Artist of the Year
| 
|-
| Survivor: Live From Harding Prison
| Long Form Video of the Year
| 
|-
| rowspan="5"| 2020
| "Rescue Story"
| Song of the Year
| 
|-
| rowspan="2" | Zach Williams
| Contemporary Christian Artist of the Year
| 
|-
| Artist of the Year
| 
|-
| rowspan="2" | Rescue Story
| Pop/Contemporary Album of the Year
| 
|-
| Recorded Music Packaging of the Year
| 
|-
| rowspan="5"| 2021
| "There Was Jesus"
| Song of the Year
| 
|-
| rowspan="2" | Zach Williams
| Contemporary Christian Artist of the Year
| 
|-
| Artist of the Year
| 
|-
| "Stand My Ground"
| Rock/Contemporary Recorded Song of the Year
| 
|-
| "There Was Jesus" 
| Pop/Contemporary Recorded Song of the Year
| 
|-
| 2022
| Zach Williams
| Artist of the Year
| 
|-
|}

 * Was a joint win alongside Ryan Stevenson's "Eye of the Storm".

Notes

References

External links
 

21st-century American male singers
21st-century American singers
American performers of Christian music
American Southern Rock musicians
Essential Records (Christian) artists
Grammy Award winners
Living people
Musicians from Pensacola, Florida
People from Jonesboro, Arkansas
Singers from Arkansas
Year of birth missing (living people)